= Soerae =

Village in Uttar Pradesh, India

Soerae is a village in Prayagraj, Uttar Pradesh, India.
